The 1938 Barnsley by-election was a by-election held on 16 June 1938 for the British House of Commons constituency of Barnsley in what was then the West Riding of Yorkshire.

The seat had become vacant on the death in April 1938 of the Labour Member of Parliament (MP) John Samuel Potts, who had represented the constituency since the 1935 general election, having previously been Barnsley's MP from 1922 to 1931.

Result 
The Labour candidate, Frank Collindridge, held the seat for his party with a slightly increased majority;

See also
Barnsley (UK Parliament constituency)
1897 Barnsley by-election
1953 Barnsley by-election
2011 Barnsley Central by-election
List of United Kingdom by-elections

References 
 
 

By-elections to the Parliament of the United Kingdom in South Yorkshire constituencies
1938 in England
1938 elections in the United Kingdom
Elections in Barnsley
1930s in Yorkshire